Mitwaba Airport  is an airport serving the town of Mitwaba in Haut-Katanga Province, Democratic Republic of the Congo.

See also

Transport in the Democratic Republic of the Congo
List of airports in the Democratic Republic of the Congo

References

External links
 FallingRain - Mitwaba Airport
 HERE Maps - Mitwaba
 OpenStreetMap - Mitwaba
 OurAirports - Mitwaba Airport

Airports in Haut-Katanga Province